The Serbian Football Championship season of 1919–20 was the first held after the end of the First World War. With the football championships still not organised at national level in the newly formed Kingdom of Serbs, Croats and Slovenes (later renamed into Yugoslavia in 1929), the clubs from Serbia joined to play in this championship organised by the  Serbian Football Federation (Srpski loptački savez).

League

See also
1920–21 Serbian Football Championship
Yugoslav First League
Serbian SuperLiga

External links
 League table at RSSSF

Serbian Football Championship
Serbia
Serbia
Football
Football